Durga Nath Subedi (born 12 December 1976) is a Nepalese cricket umpire. Subedi has umpired five One Day Internationals and sixteen Twenty20 Internationals.

See also
 List of One Day International cricket umpires
 List of Twenty20 International cricket umpires

References

External links 
 

1976 births
Living people
People from Ilam District
Nepalese cricket umpires
Nepalese One Day International cricket umpires
Nepalese Twenty20 International cricket umpires